Ortaköy is a neighbourhood in Istanbul.

Ortaköy may also refer to:

Places
 The former Ottoman name of Ivaylovgrad, a town in Haskovo Province, Bulgaria
 Ortaköy, Nicosia, Cyprus

Turkey
 Ortaköy, Aksaray
 Ortaköy, Amasya
 Ortaköy, Artvin
 Ortaköy, Çal
 Ortaköy, Çorum
 Ortaköy, Feke, village in Adana Province
 Ortaköy, Hınıs
 Ortaköy, İnegöl
 Ortaköy, İspir
 Ortaköy, Kale
 Ortaköy, Mardin
 Ortaköy, Mudurnu
 Ortaköy, Sungurlu
 Ortaköy, Orhaneli
 Ortaköy, Taşköprü
 Ortaköy, Tercan
 Ortaköy, Tufanbeyli, village in Adana Province
 Ortaköy, Uludere, a village in Şırnak province

Other uses
 Ortaköy Mosque, a mosque in Ortaköy, Istanbul
 Ortaköy Spor Kulübü, a football club in Ortaköy, Istanbul